, provisional designation , is a Jupiter trojan from the Greek camp, approximately  in diameter. It was discovered on 18 October 1998, by astronomers with the Lowell Observatory Near-Earth-Object Search at the Anderson Mesa Station near Flagstaff, Arizona, in the United States. The dark Jovian asteroid is a slow rotator with a long rotation period of potentially 400 hours. It has not been named since its numbering in January 2000.

Orbit and classification 

 is a dark Jovian asteroid in a 1:1 orbital resonance with Jupiter. It is located in the leading Greek camp at the Gas Giant's  Lagrangian point, 60° ahead of its orbit . It is also a non-family asteroid in the Jovian background population. It orbits the Sun at a distance of 4.7–5.8 AU once every 11 years and 12 months (4,367 days; semi-major axis of 5.23 AU). Its orbit has an eccentricity of 0.10 and an inclination of 7° with respect to the ecliptic. The body's observation arc begins with a precovery taken at Palomar Observatory in February 1954, more than 44 years prior to its official discovery observation at Anderson Mesa.

Numbering and naming 

This minor planet was numbered by the MPC on 24 January 2000. As of 2018, it has not been named.

Physical characteristics 

 is an assumed C-type asteroid, while most larger Jupiter trojans are D-types.

Rotation period 

Lightcurve analysis gave a rotation period of  hours with a brightness variation of 0.23 magnitude. One month later, a second, lower-rated lightcurve by Kepler determined an alternative period of  hours with an amplitude of 0.20. As of 2018, no secure period of this slow rotator has yet been obtained.

Diameter and albedo 

According to the survey carried out by the NEOWISE mission of NASA's Wide-field Infrared Survey Explorer,  measures 33.30 kilometers in diameter and its surface has an albedo of 0.058, while the Collaborative Asteroid Lightcurve Link assumes a standard albedo for a carbonaceous asteroid of 0.057 and calculates a diameter of 32.03 kilometers based on an absolute magnitude of 11.2.

References

External links 
 Asteroid Lightcurve Database (LCDB), query form (info )
 Discovery Circumstances: Numbered Minor Planets (10001)-(15000) – Minor Planet Center
 Asteroid (13366) 1998 US24 at the Small Bodies Data Ferret
 
 

013366
013366
013366
19981018